Pip the Troll is a fictional character appearing in American comic books published by Marvel Comics.

He made his live-action debut in the Marvel Cinematic Universe film Eternals (2021), voiced by Patton Oswalt.

Publication history
Pip the Troll was introduced by Jim Starlin in Strange Tales vol 2 #179 (February 1975) to be a comic foil to the story's protagonist, Adam Warlock. Pip returned in Strange Tales vol 2 #180-181 (March–April 1975) and Warlock vol 1 #9-12 (October 1975-Jan 1976) before his death in Avengers Annual #7 (March 1977).

Starlin revived the character years later in Silver Surfer vol 3 #46 (December 1990). Pip played a role in the 1991 Infinity Gauntlet crossover before joining the titular team of Warlock and the Infinity Watch in issue two (March 1992). He appeared in the title until its cancellation in 1995 with issue 42. During its run, the character was also featured in the Infinity War, Infinity Crusade, and Blood and Thunder crossovers.

After a brief appearance in a back up feature in Cosmic Powers Unlimited #4 (1996), the character was not seen again until 2002 when Starlin used him in Infinity Abyss #1-6. He returned in Marvel: The End #5-6 (2003) and Thanos #3-4 (2004), She-Hulk #12-13 (2005), and X-Factor #207-213 (2010–2011).

Fictional character biography
Pip was once Prince Gofern of the planet Laxidazia, in the Dolenz System, in the Milky Way galaxy. He was originally an alien of the Laxidazian race who enjoyed painting pictures of the night sky. Pip became physically and psychologically mutated into a morally degenerate, stunted, satyr-like form known as a "troll" during a bout of drunkenness brought on by a mutagenic hallucinogenic ale. Like all Laxidazian trolls, Pip has four digits (including opposable thumb) on each hand, hooflike feet, and large pointed ears; apparently, normal Laxidazians are nearly identical to Earth humans. After his transformation, his people, also sick of his lewd, lecherous, and hedonistic behavior, strip him of his office and rank. He stows away on a spaceship and continues his life of debauchery. Pip began his habit of dressing in a pair of maroon, ripped pants and nothing else.

Missionaries from the Universal Church of Truth visit Pip's home planet and discover the trolls are resistant to the church's conversion process. As a result, all trolls are ordered to be killed. Pip himself is caught after making trouble on dozens of planets, many controlled by the church. He ends up on a ship full of men and women who were to be executed. There he meets Adam Warlock, whose alternate future self the Magus would become the leader of the Church of Truth. Pip teamed up with Warlock to escape and go on adventures. Pip then meets Gamora. Pip meets Thanos, and alongside Warlock, Gamora, and Thanos, he battles the Magus and the Universal Church. Pip revealed how he was transformed into a troll. He encounters Starfox and Heater Delight, and battles Pro-Boscis the Procurer. Eventually the threat of the Magus was neutralized and Pip parted company with Adam on the world of Sirus X.

After getting into much more trouble, Pip decided to look for Adam again. Pip explored one of Thanos' old hideouts and discovered not Adam, but Thanos himself. Thanos destroyed Pip's mind, but Adam was able to absorb Pip's soul into the Soul Gem (killing his mindless body, but restoring full mental function to his soul), reuniting him with the spirits of Gamora and eventually Adam Warlock in Soulworld within the Soul Gem.

Pip resided in Soulworld for some time. While there, he accompanied the Silver Surfer and Captain Autolycus in search of Warlock. He witnessed a battle between Warlock and Drax the Destroyer.

Infinity Watch
Pip, Gamora, and Warlock return to the corporeal world during the Infinity Gauntlet incident by taking over bodies of three crash victims. Pip, in possession of the body of Ralph Bunker, and Gamora were both shown to have significantly increased physical strength in their new bodies. However, soon after returning to life, Gamora disappeared. Alongside Warlock, Pip conferred with Doctor Strange, Rintrah, Doctor Doom, and the Silver Surfer regarding Thanos and the Infinity Gauntlet. Alongside Doctor Strange, Clea, and Rintrah, Pip battled Silver Dagger. Alongside Rintrah, Pip time-traveled to Earth's Jurassic era to rescue Firelord and Drax the Destroyer. Alongside Warlock and Gamora, Pip visited Thanos after his defeat. With Gamora, Pip summoned Doctor Strange to deal with the seemingly power-mad Warlock, but was reconciled with Warlock.

Afterwards, Pip was given the Space Gem by Warlock, keeping it between his toes for safekeeping. Pip joined Warlock's Infinity Watch. With the Infinity Watch, Pip was captured by the Man Beast, but rescued by Warlock. Pip and his friends end up setting shop on Monster Island. Pip takes too much as usual and abusing the hospitality of Mole Man. In a dispute over the sovereignty of the island, forces of the United Nations invade. Pip and the others hang back as Gamora cleans house, killing no one. The group makes bets on the fight.

Around this time, the events known as the Infinity War happen. When Warlock had control of the Infinity Gauntlet, he had forced out the good and evil sides of himself. The evil side returns as Warlock's long-term adversary, the Magus. Pip is drawn into the fight when Thanos recruits the Watch. As most of Earth's heroes do not trust Thanos, Pip and his friends were forced to battle them as well. Eventually both sides work together to take down the Magus.

Infinity Crusade
Pip became deeply involved in the Infinity Crusade. He manages to be a capable 'leader' of the remnants of the Infinity Watch when various events took most of them away. Moondragon, for example, is brainwashed and taken by the Goddess, the 'good' side of Adam Warlock. She is using a Cosmic Egg, the merging of several Cosmic Cubes, to implement her plans, which involve brainwashing dozens of superheroes. Left on Monster Island with Maxam and Drax the Destroyer, the three argue over who should lead. Pip decides to go outside the group for help and kidnaps Mister Fantastic. The leader of the Fantastic Four  soon realizes what is going on and pitches in to help. This, and the kidnapping of other superheroes, brings everyone together, Pip included, at Avengers Mansion and actually spurs on the heroic efforts of the rest of the super-powered community. Pip is spurred to create a new, 'super-heroic' costume, but he fails to wash himself while changing. His body odor is so offensive the Hulk forcibly bathes him.

After Infinity Watch
Professor X proceeds to make telepathic contact with one of the Goddess' thralls, Pip's former ally, Moondragon. Pip secretly touches Xavier and his powers make contact through the link, allowing him to know the location of the Goddess because Moondragon knows it.

Pip teleports to it, in the center of the Goddess' planet, a new form of Counter-Earth. By touching the Cosmic Egg, Pip gains access to its near-infinite powers. He turns the Goddess into salt. He manifests a throne and sits upon it, musing as to what to do with his newfound powers. He reflects on many plans for Earth, such as making super-powered beings wash his car and changing all the females, including the overweight and elderly, into shapely, twenty-something women. One of his goals is to gain revenge on the Hulk for forcibly bathing him; however, he realizes none of this will make him truly happy, and therefore decides on something that will: a simple birthday party thrown for him by his friends. Before he can implement this, he is subdued by the brainwashed guardian of the Egg, the female New Warriors member Silhouette. She had been hiding in a nearby container, for just this sort of situation.

Pip also appears in Marvel: The End #5–6 and She-Hulk (2005 series) #12–13. Pip assisted Thanos in his first quest after his experience in Marvel: The End in Thanos #1–6.

X-Factor Investigations
Pip is next seen when Hela, Norse goddess of death, appears in disguise and hires X-Factor Investigations to find a missing pendant of Thor's hammer. When Jamie Madrox and Banshee track it down and take it off of the neck of a drunken bar patron, he reverts to Pip the Troll. Without the pendant hiding him, Hela is able to track down Pip, whom she captures. This angers X-Factor leader Madrox, who feels responsible, and the team travels to Las Vegas and saves the troll with the help of Thor. Pip follows X-Factor back to New York and joins the team, serving as receptionist, out of gratitude for their actions; however, a mysterious phone call Pip receives reveals that Pip has other, as-yet-unknown reasons for joining the group.

It appeared Pip was killed by a woman he previously helped. The woman shoots him in the head after claiming that "X-Factor will fall". The injury was not fatal due to his non-human physique: Laxidazians's brains are in their chest, next to the heart, as he explains later.

Powers and abilities
When in possession of the Space Gem, Pip could theoretically access virtually incalculable powers, but chose to use it merely for transportation and teleportation. The gem gave him the ability to teleport to places he knows of. This he often used for his own ends, stealing the Fantasticar and other objects. When forced into battle, he tends to appear directly above his adversary's head, intending to deliver a powerful blow. He has since lost the Space Gem, but his long-term exposure to it has given him the innate ability to teleport.

In other media

Television
 Pip the Troll appears in Silver Surfer, voiced by Robert Bockstael. Pip is the close companion of Silver Surfer, whom he follows on his quest to find Silver Surfer's treasured homeworld Zenn-La after it was moved to another location by Galactus. In this show, he is one of a race of Trolls created to be the Kree's slave labor force.

Film
 Pip makes a non-speaking cameo appearance in Planet Hulk.
 Pip appears in Eternals, voiced by Patton Oswalt. He appears in a mid-credits scene with Starfox to see if the Eternals need any aid. Starfox does reprimand him for the unnecessary introduction.

Video games
Pip appears throughout Marvel's Guardians of the Galaxy.

References

External links
 Pip the Troll at Marvel.com
 Pip Gofern (Earth-616) at Marvel Wiki

Characters created by Jim Starlin
Comics characters introduced in 1975
Fictional artists
Fictional princes
Fictional trolls
Marvel Comics aliens
Marvel Comics characters who can teleport
Marvel Comics superheroes
Marvel Comics supervillains